Via Tribunali is a pizzeria with two locations in Seattle, in the U.S. state of Washington. Currently operating the city's Capitol Hill and Queen Anne neighborhoods, the restaurant previously operated in the Georgetown neighborhood and in New York City and Portland, Oregon. The business was established in 2004.

Description 
The Italian restaurant specializes in Neapolitan pizzas. The salame has salame piccante, pomodoro, mozzarella, basil, and grana padano. The menu has also included calzones, tartufo, and cocktails.

History 
The Portland restaurant opened in Old Town Chinatown in 2011 and closed in 2015.

Mark McConnell and Cecilia Rikard own the business as of 2022.

See also 

 List of pizza chains of the United States
 Pizza in Portland, Oregon

References

External links

 

2004 establishments in Washington (state)
Capitol Hill, Seattle
Defunct Italian restaurants in New York City
Defunct Italian restaurants in Portland, Oregon
Georgetown, Seattle
Italian restaurants in Seattle
Old Town Chinatown
Pizza chains of the United States
Pizzerias in New York City
Pizzerias in Portland, Oregon
Queen Anne, Seattle